Entre gris clair et gris foncé is a 1987 double album recorded by French artist Jean-Jacques Goldman. It was his fifth studio album and was released in November 1987. It provided four successful singles: "Elle a fait un bébé toute seule" (#4), "Là-bas" (#2), "C'est ta chance" (#16) and "Puisque tu pars" (#3). The album was also very successful.

Background and release
The first nine songs are new compositions. The other eleven songs were written years before. Goldman always wrote one or two songs for each album that either didn't fit the mood of the record or that were too personal. When he started becoming popular, he thought it would be a good opportunity to release some previously unheard songs.

While preparing this album, the new songs were tracked in the studio. The old songs were either recorded live or were recorded using only acoustic instruments.

For the album's first CD release, two songs were omitted ("Tout Petit Monde" and "Il Me Restera") due to time limitations on a compact disc. The 2000 version contained the original LP track listing, this time spread out on two CDs. The first CD contains "new" songs, while the second disc contains eleven previously unreleased songs.

Commercial success
The album entered the French SNEP Albums Chart atop and stayed here for 18 consecutive weeks and 78 in the top 50. It was certified diamond for a million copies in France.

Track listing
All tracks written, composed and performed by Goldman (except "Là-bas", performed as a duet with Sirima).

Original release
 Cassette / Vinyl / CD
 "À quoi tu sers ?" – 5:29
 "Il changeait la vie" – 3:50
 "Là-bas" (duet with Sirima) – 5:46
 "Entre gris clair et gris foncé" – 3:59
 "C'est ta chance" – 4:26
 "Puisque tu pars" – 7:20
 "Des bouts de moi" – 4:40
 "Fais des bébés" – 4:04
 "Filles faciles" – 3:44
 "Je commence demain" – 2:42
 "Elle a fait un bébé toute seule" – 3:47
 "Quelque part, quelqu'un" – 4:22
 "Qu'elle soit elle" – 1:47
 "Doux" – 3:53
 "Reprendre c'est voler" – 2:48
 "Il y a" – 3:37
 "Peur de rien blues" – 5:20
 "Appartenir" – 2:22

2000s release

Disc 1
 "À quoi tu sers ?" – 5:30
 "Il changeait la vie" – 3:59
 "Tout petit monde" – 3:30
 "Entre gris clair et gris foncé" – 4:01
 "Là-bas" (duet with Sirima) – 5:40
 "C'est ta chance" – 5:09
 "Des bouts de moi" – 5:05
 "Fais des bébés" – 4:03
 "Puisque tu pars" – 7:35

Disc 2
 "Filles faciles" – 3:45
 "Je commence demain" – 2:48
 "Elle a fait un bébé toute seule" – 3:54
 "Quelque part, quelqu'un" – 4:48
 "Qu'elle soit elle" – 1:54
 "Doux" – 3:55
 "Reprendre c'est voler" – 2:50
 "Il y a" – 3:39
 "Peur de rien blues" – 6:19
 "Il me restera" – 3:14
 "Appartenir" – 2:24

Japan release  
Japanese edition of the album, released in 1989 and contains thirteen tracks, five of which are from Non homologué.
 "(Intro) A quoi tu sers ?" – 5:29
 "Il changeait la vie" – 3:59
 "Là-bas" – 5:40
 "Entre gris clair et gris foncé" – 4:00
 "C'est ta chance" – 5:08
 "Puisque tu pars" – 7:35
 "Des bouts de moi" – 5:05
 "Fais des bébés" – 4:03
 "Je te donne" – 4:25
 "Famille" – 5:33
 "La vie par procuration" – 4:13
 "Parler d'ma vie" – 5:08
 "Pas toi" — 5:31

Personnel
 Claude Samard – banjo, bottleneck guitar, guitar, dobro
 Guy Delacroix – bass, programmation, bass programmation, keyboards
 Claude Le Péron – bass
 Clément Bailly, Christophe Deschamps, Jean-François Gauthier – drum kit
 Joe Hammer – drum kit, acoustic drum kit, Fairlight
 Roland Romanelli – synthesizers, keyboards
 Sirima – vocals
 G & M Costa, Sorj Chalandon, Carole Fredericks, Caroline Goldman, Catherine Goldman, Dorothée Goldman, Evelyne Goldman, Michael Goldman, Patricia Goldman, Robert Goldman – chorus
 Jean-Jacques Goldman – keyboards, chorus, guitar, piano, synthesizers, arrangements, producer
 Marc Lumbroso – chorus, producer
 Michael Jones – chorus, guitars
 Gérard Kawcynski, Basile Leroux, Patrice Tison – guitars
 Philippe Grandvoinet – Hammond B3, piano
 Jean-Jacques Milteau – harmonica
 Patrick Bourgoin, Prof Pinpin – saxophone
 Patrice Blanchard, Patrice Mondon – violins
Technical 
 Cathy Steinberg – design
 Claude Gassian – photography 
 Olivier do Espirito Santo, Jean-Pierre Janiaud, Andy Scott – sound engineers

Charts, certifications and sales

References

1987 albums
Jean-Jacques Goldman albums
Epic Records albums